Dinkelland is a municipality in the eastern Netherlands. For a short time it was known as Denekamp (one of its component towns) until it was renamed in 2002.

Population centres

Notable people 
 Johan Jongkind (1819 in Lattrop – 1891) a Dutch painter and printmaker
 Theo Budde (1889 in Ootmarsum - 1959) a watchmaker, jeweler, antique dealer and poet
 Ton Schulten (born 1938 in Ootmarsum) a Dutch painter who mainly paints landscapes
 Roméo Dallaire (born 1946 in Denekamp) a Canadian humanitarian, author, statesman and retired senator and general
 Marcha (born 1956 in Lattrop) a Dutch singer and TV presenter, took part in the 1987 Eurovision Song Contest
 Han Polman (born 1963 in Ootmarsum) a Dutch politician
 Tanja Nijmeijer (born 1978 in Denekamp) a Dutch former guerrilla fighter in Colombia and English teacher

Sport 
 Felix von Heijden (1890 in Weerselo – 1982) a footballer team bronze medallist at the 1920 Summer Olympics; & Mayor of Rosmalen 1923–1955 
 Hennie Kuiper (born 1949 in Denekamp) a former professional road racing cyclist, gold medallist at the 1972 Summer Olympics
 Jos Lansink (born 1961 in Weerselo) an equestrian, team gold medallist at the 1992 Summer Olympics
 Marieke Westerhof (born 1974 in Denekamp) a retired rower, team silver medallist at the 2000 Summer Olympics
 Elles Leferink (born 1976 in Weerselo) a volleyball player, competed at the 1996 Summer Olympics

References

External links

Official website 

 
Populated places in Overijssel
Municipalities of Overijssel
Municipalities of the Netherlands established in 2002